Shariff Saydona Mustapha, officially the Municipality of Shariff Saydona Mustapha (Maguindanaon: Inged nu Shariff Saydona Mustapha; Iranun: Inged a Shariff Saydona Mustapha), is a  municipality in the province of Maguindanao del Sur, Philippines. According to the 2020 census, it has a population of 25,080 people.

It was created out of 4 barangays from the municipality of Shariff Aguak, 4 entire barangays and a portion of one barangay from Mamasapano, 2 barangays from Datu Unsay, one barangay from Datu Piang, and 3 entire barangays and a portion of one barangay from Datu Saudi-Ampatuan by virtue of Muslim Mindanao Autonomy Act No. 225 (as amended by MMAA Act No. 252), which was subsequently ratified in a plebiscite held on July 30, 2009.

Shariff Saydona Mustapha was an Arab missionary from Mecca and a paternal uncle of Shariff Kabungsuwan of Johore (the first Sultan of Maguindanao). He arrived in Mainland Mindanao in the mid-15th century. He is the ancestor of the Ampatuan, Mangacop, Masukat and Sangki clans of Maguindanao.

Geography

Barangays

Shariff Saydona Mustapha is politically subdivided into 16 barangays.

Bakat
Dale-Bong
Dasawao
Datu Bakal
Datu Kilay
Duguengen
Ganta
Inaladan
Libutan
Linantangan
Nabundas
Pagatin
Pagatin (Pagatin I)
Pamalian
Pikeg
Pusao

Climate

Demographics

Economy

References

External links
 Shariff Saydona Mustapha Profile at the DTI Cities and Municipalities Competitive Index
MMA Act No. 225 : An Act Creating the Municipality of Shariff Saidona Mustapha in the Province of Maguindanao
 [ Philippine Standard Geographic Code]
2007 Census Population Figures for Maguindanao
COMELEC - Plebiscite results for 3 new Maguindanao towns
COMELEC Resolution No. 8169

Municipalities of Maguindanao del Sur